The Azerbaijan First Division 2010-11 is the second-level of football in Azerbaijan, it is also known as the Birinci Dästä. Fourteen teams participated in Azerbaijani First Division in 2010-11.

Teams

League table

See also
 2010–11 Azerbaijan Premier League
 2010–11 Azerbaijan Cup

References

External links
 pfl.az
 AFFA 

Azerbaijan First Division seasons
2010–11 in Azerbaijani football
Azer